Metaperiaptodes samarensis is a species of beetle in the family Cerambycidae. It was described by Stephan von Breuning in 1974.

References

Lamiini
Beetles described in 1974